Steeve Gerard Fankà (born 28 February 1988) is a Cameroonian former professional footballer who played as a defender.

Biography
Born in Douala, Cameroon, Steeve Gerard Fankà started his professional career in Italy. An illegal immigrant, he was signed by Astrea on 20 October 2006 as non-EU amateur player, as he declared that he was not registered as footballer in other nation, but rejected by FIGC because his residence permit did not fulfill the requirement (12 months residence legally before the application, which Fankà started on 16 September 2006), and the appeal rejected on 9 January, thus missing the registration deadline on 31 December.

In the next season, he joined Serie B side Ascoli and played at their Primavera under–20 team. In 2008–09 season, he remained in Primavera team as overage player.

He made his Serie B debut on 16 May 2009, against league strugglers Salernitana, replacing Luigi Giorgi in the 76th minute. The match ended in a 2–0 loss.

In 2009–10 season, he changed his shirt from 87 to 65 but failed to receive any call–up.

References

External links
 Profile at Lega-calcio.it 
 Profile at Football.it 
 

Living people
1988 births
Footballers from Douala
Association football defenders
Cameroonian footballers
Cameroonian expatriate footballers
Serie B players
Ascoli Calcio 1898 F.C. players
Cameroonian expatriate sportspeople in Italy
Expatriate footballers in Italy